Kate Keltie (born 23 February 1986) is an Australian former actress, best known for her role as Michelle Scully in the Australian television soap opera drama Neighbours.

Biography
Keltie was born in Melbourne. She appeared in a number of television commercials and undertook drama, dance and voice training. She was eight years old when she made the first of three guest appearances in police drama Blue Heelers. She also appeared in Full Frontal, Halifax f.p., and ten episodes of the English language show More Than Words for ABC. She played the role of Becky Daniels in children's sci-fi drama Thunderstone from 1999 until 2000.

In 1999, Keltie joined the cast of the soap opera Neighbours as Michelle Scully. Being 13 at the time, Keltie completed her schooling with the help of an on-set tutor. In 2002, Keltie created and organised The Showbiz and Entertainment Expo, held at the Melbourne Convention and Exhibition Centre. Keltie departed Neighbours in 2003 to return to school and pursue new roles. She made a brief return to the serial in 2004. She admitted that when she left Neighbours in 2003, she did not think she would come back, but she really enjoyed her character's return storyline. Keltie played Bec Cleary in Blue Heelers that same year. Her last television appearance was a guest role in an episode of Rush in 2008.

Keltie later worked in legal support in a law firm, and then moved into the recruitment-support industry. In July 2017 she joined Australian recruitment agency people2people.

On 28 November 2022, it was announced that Keltie had been diagnosed with stage IV breast cancer. A fundraising page was set up by her family, as she is unable to work while undergoing chemotherapy.

References

External links
 

1986 births
Living people
Actresses from Melbourne
Australian television actresses
Australian child actresses
 Australian soap opera actresses